The Lax–Wendroff method, named after Peter Lax and Burton Wendroff, is a numerical method for the solution of hyperbolic partial differential equations, based on finite differences. It is second-order accurate in both space and time. This method is an example of explicit time integration where the function that defines the governing equation is evaluated at the current time.

Definition 
Suppose one has an equation of the following form:

Linear case 

Here  refers to the  dimension and  refers to the  dimension.
This linear scheme can be extended to the general non-linear case in different ways. One of them is letting

Non-linear case 
The conservative form of Lax-Wendroff for a general non-linear equation is then:

Jacobian free methods 
To avoid the Jacobian evaluation, use a two-step procedure.

Richtmyer method 
What follows is the Richtmyer two-step Lax–Wendroff method.

First (Lax) steps:

Second step:

MacCormack method 

Another method of this same type was proposed by MacCormack. MacCormack's method uses first forward differencing and then backward differencing:

First step:

Second step:

Alternatively,
First step:

Second step:

References

 Michael J. Thompson, An Introduction to Astrophysical Fluid Dynamics, Imperial College Press, London, 2006.

Numerical differential equations
Computational fluid dynamics